Merlon Lynn Stevenson (October 31, 1923 – April 10, 2021) was an American physicist. He cofounded Luis Walter Alvarez's research group at the Lawrence Berkeley National Laboratory. His first paper presented internationally described proton-generated mesons using results generated by the lab's cyclotron.

Among doctoral candidates he advised are George Kalbfleisch, John Marriner, and Bill Gary. In 1966-1967 he held a visiting professorship at the University of Heidelberg in Germany.

During World War II, Stevenson enlisted at Fort Douglas; following basic training, he volunteered as an aeronautics engineer. The Army sent him to City College of New York where he was educated in mechanical engineering. He was then sent to Fort Belvoir in order to learn both the setting-up and the defusing of mines. However, he was, instead of Europe, sent to Okinawa by Army Intelligence to analyze aerial photographs.

Stevenson was an avid bicyclist who, as a member of the East Bay bicycle coalition in the early 1970s, helped establish bike paths and bike racks for campus buses.

Stevenson retired in 1991 and was named professor emeritus. Shortly thereafter he was diagnosed with Parkinson's disease.

References 

1923 births
2021 deaths
People from Ogden, Utah
People from Berkeley, California
20th-century American physicists
American nuclear physicists
Particle physicists
Experimental physicists
Accelerator physicists
Fellows of the American Physical Society
University of California, Berkeley faculty
Latter Day Saints from Utah
Latter Day Saints from California
United States Army personnel of World War II
American expatriates in Germany